Aravena is a surname that may refer to:

Alejandro Aravena, (born 1967), Chilean architect
Boris Aravena (born 1982), Chilean footballer
Claudia Aravena (born 1968), Chilean artist, filmmaker, and professor
Jorge Aravena (born 1969), Peruvian-Venezuelan actor
Jorge Aravena Llanca (born 1936), Chilean photographer, writer, researcher and singer-songwriter
Jorge Orlando Aravena Plaza (born 1958), Chilean footballer
Manuel Aravena (born 1954), Chilean cyclist
Mario Aravena (born 1985), Chilean footballer
Orlando Aravena (born 1942), Chilean footballer and manager
Víctor Aravena (born 1990), Chilean athlete